The 2021 Hankook 24 Hours of Barcelona or 2021 Hankook 24 Hours of Barcelona - Trofeo Fermí Vélez was  the 22nd running of the 24 Hours of Barcelona which took place from 3 to 5 September 2021 at the Circuit de Barcelona-Catalunya. It was also the fifth round of the 2021 24H GT and TCE Series.

Schedule

Entry list
32 cars were entered into the event; 24 GT cars and 8 TCEs.

Results

Qualifying

TCE
Fastest in class in bold.

GT
Fastest in class in bold.

Race
Class winner in bold.

References

External links

24 Hours of Barcelona
24 Hours of Barcelona
2021 in 24H Series